This is a list of wars involving the Republic of Chile from 1810 to the present.

Notes

References

 
Chile
Wars
Wars